Gotska Sandön (literally translated as "The Gotlandic Sand Island") is an uninhabited Swedish island north of Gotland in the Baltic Sea. It has been a national park since 1909.

Geography 
The island is part of Fårö socken (not to be confused with parish). It comprises the same area as the administrative Fårö District, established on 1January 2016.

On the northwest tip of the island is a church, Gotska Sandön Chapel. , Gotska Sandön Chapel along with Fårö Church belong to Fårö parish in Norra Gotlands pastorat.

During the summer, there are regular boat tours from Fårö Island and Nynäshamn on the mainland.

Nature of Gotska Sandön 
The island consists mostly of sand and is dominated by beaches, dunes and especially pine forests. Aside from a colony of grey seals, the higher fauna is not very rich. Terrestrial or aerial mammals include mountain hares and bats. However, the island is home to many rare insects and plants, including the Kashubian vetch and several species of orchid.

Climate 
Despite its isolation from sizeable landmasses, Gotska Sandön's oceanic climate is warm for its latitude. The Scandinavian Peninsula to the west, Gotland to the south and the Baltic landmass to the east contribute to warmer summers and frequent winter frost, giving the island a far broader temperature range than, for example, the similarly isolated Fair Isle, which lies one degree further north some distance off the coast of Scotland. In spite of this range, summer highs are cool by the standards of southern Sweden, and winter nights are among the mildest in the country.

Gotska Sandön has significant seasonal lag: despite dwindling daylight hours, August is much warmer than June, while March days are both longer and colder than those in December.

Gallery

References

External links 

 Sweden's National Parks: Gotska Sandön National Park from the Swedish Environmental Protection Agency
Gotska Sandön (in Swedish)
Gotska Sandön National Park (in Swedish)
Gotska Sandön National Park (English)
Birds on Gotska Sandön

Gotland
Swedish islands in the Baltic
National parks of Sweden
Protected areas established in 1909
Islands of Gotland County
Tourist attractions in Gotland County
1909 establishments in Sweden
Geography of Gotland County
Uninhabited islands of Sweden